The Faisal Cantonmentis a cantonment town of the city of Karachi, in Sindh, Pakistan. It serves as an Airforce base and residential establishment. 

PAF Base established in 1925, as a strategically important British Royal Air force Base.  Drigh Road Cantonment was established in 1925 for the civilian population near the British Royal Air force Base, vide Government of Bombay Revenue Department Notification No.4840/24 dated 04-11-1925. In 1947 it was renamed as Faisal Cantonment. The municipal limits of the Cantonment Board were altered twice: in 1988 and 1995. The Board was classified as Class I in 2002, and has a population of 292,196 (census 2017).It is not only home to the first airfield established by the Royal Air Force in the sub-Continent but can be considered as a mini Pakistan as well . The population is a vibrant mix of all provinces and the active generations of the initial mohajirs (settlers) after the independence in 1947.

Working Departments
 CEO Office
 PA TO CEO
 Assistant Secretary 
 Office Superintendent
 Engineering Branch
 Building Control Cell
 Electric Branch
 Water Supply Branch
 Revenue Branch
 Workshop Branch
 Legal Branch
 Land Branch
 Account Branch
 Establishment Branch
 CB Care Center
 Sanitation Branch
 Horticulture Branch 
 Sponsorship Branch
 IT Branch
 Store Branch

Neighborhoods
 Haidri Goth
 Malir Halt
 Massan Ghat
 Millat Colony
 Pak Sadat Colony
 Rehmanabad Housing Project
 Sindh Baloch Society

Areas
 Defence Officers Housing Authority
 Gulshan-e-Amna
 Gulshan-e-Jamal
 Askari-IV
 KDA Officers Co-operative Housing Society
 KDA Scheme-1/A(Extension)
 Khosa Goth
 Old Iqbalabad
 T and T Colony

Gulistan-e-Johar

 Block-15
 Block-16-A
 Block-17
 Block-18
 Block-19
 Block-20
 Gulshan-e-Iqbal Block-10-A
 Gulistan-e-Jauhar Block 19

See also
 Army Cantonment Board, Pakistan
 Cantonment

References

External links

Cantonments in Karachi
Cantonments of Pakistan
1925 establishments in India